"Hood Took Me Under" is a song by American West Coast hip hop group Compton's Most Wanted, released as a single from their third studio album Music to Driveby. Its lyrics were written and performed by MC Eiht. It was recorded at Big Beat Soundlabs in Los Angeles, produced by DJ Mike T, and released via Orpheus Records/Epic Records. The song samples Isaac Hayes' version of "Walk On By". The single peaked at #5 on the Hot Rap Songs and at #63 on the Hot R&B/Hip-Hop Singles Sales in the United States.

The song was featured in 2004 video game Grand Theft Auto: San Andreas in the fictional radio station Radio Los Santos. In the music video, several scenes depict gang-life in Los Angeles, and a little boy is shown growing up with the gangs and ending up in prison.

Track listing

Personnel
Aaron Tyler – lyrics, vocals
Michael Bryant – producer
Terry Keith Allen – producer (tracks: 5, 6)
Andre Manuel – executive producer
Mike "Webeboomindashit" Edwards – mixing, recording
Brian Gardner – mastering

Charts

References

External links

1992 songs
Gangsta rap songs
Compton's Most Wanted songs
Epic Records singles